Leesville may refer to:

Cities in the United States
Batesburg-Leesville, South Carolina
Leesville, California
Leesville, Connecticut
Leesville, Illinois
Leesville, Indiana
Leesville, Louisiana
Leesville, Missouri
Leesville, New Jersey
Leesville, North Carolina
Leesville, Ohio, Carroll County
Leesville, Crawford County, Ohio
Leesville, Texas
Leesville, Virginia

Civic facilities
Leesville Airport
Leesville High School
Leesville Road High School, and its campus Leesville Complex

See also
 
Leeville (disambiguation)